This is a list of the candidates of the 2019 New South Wales state election, held on 23 March 2019.

568 candidates nominated for the Legislative Assembly, while 346 nominated for the Legislative Council.

Retiring MPs
The seat of Wollondilly was vacant following the resignation of Liberal MP Jai Rowell on 17 December 2018.

Members who chose not to renominate for the 2019 election are as follows:

Labor
Luke Foley MP (Auburn) – announced 9 November 2018
Ernest Wong MLC – lost preselection 12 June 2018

Liberal
Greg Aplin MP (Albury) – announced 1 August 2018
Glenn Brookes MP (East Hills) – announced 4 August 2018
Pru Goward MP (Goulburn) – announced 19 December 2018
Chris Patterson MP (Camden) – announced 28 September 2018
David Clarke MLC – announced retirement September 2018
Scot MacDonald MLC – announced 12 November 2018

Nationals
Andrew Fraser MP (Coffs Harbour) – announced 14 June 2018
Thomas George MP (Lismore) – announced 30 June 2017
Troy Grant MP (Dubbo) – announced 12 July 2018
Kevin Humphries MP (Barwon) – announced 1 June 2017
Rick Colless MLC – did not renominate

Shooters, Fishers and Farmers
Robert Brown MLC – lost preselection 5 February 2019

Legislative Assembly
Sitting members are shown in bold text. Successful candidates are highlighted in the relevant colour. Where there is possible confusion, an asterisk (*) is also used.

Legislative Council
Sitting members are shown in bold text. Tickets that elected at least one MLC are highlighted in the relevant colour. Successful candidates are identified by an asterisk (*).

Half of the Legislative Council was not up for re-election. This included seven Labor members (John Graham, Courtney Houssos, Shaoquett Moselmane, Adam Searle, Walt Secord, Mick Veitch and Lynda Voltz), six Liberal members (John Ajaka, Lou Amato, Scott Farlow, Don Harwin, Shayne Mallard and Matthew Mason-Cox), three Nationals members (Ben Franklin, Trevor Khan and Bronnie Taylor), two Greens members (Cate Faehrmann and Justin Field), one Christian Democrats member (Fred Nile), one Shooters and Fishers member (Robert Borsak) and one Animal Justice member (Mark Pearson). Voltz and Franklin resigned to run for the Legislative Assembly, so their seats were vacant.

The Labor Party was defending five seats. The Liberal-National Coalition was defending eleven seats. The Greens were defending three seats. The Christian Democratic Party and the Shooters and Fishers Party were each defending one seat.

References

2019